Acid Monkey is the fourth album from the glam metal band BulletBoys, released in 1995 on Swordholio Records. The album marks a change in direction and style after the breakup of the band in 1993, featuring more of an alternative rock and pop punk influence, with singer Marq Torien and bassist Lonnie Vencent continuing to release albums under the BulletBoys name. Torien and Vincent were joined by guitarist Tommy Pittam and drummer Robby Karras for this album.

Reception 
AllMusic rated the album 2 and a half stars out of 5, but no review is written.

Track listing

Personnel
Marq Torien: Lead Vocals
 Tommy Pittam: Guitar
 Lonnie Vencent: Bass
 Robby Karras: Drums

References

1995 albums
BulletBoys albums